The Justices Commitment Act 1741 (15 Geo. II, c.24) was an Act of the Parliament of Great Britain passed in 1742 and formally repealed in 1914. It clarified the powers of Justices of the Peace to imprison convicts.

Many towns did not maintain their own prisons, and as such the power of Justices in those towns to sentence someone to imprisonment had become questioned. To resolve doubts which had arisen on the matter, the Act declared that the justices of the peace of a liberty or corporation, on sentencing someone to be sent to a house of correction, could send them to the house of correction of the county in which the liberty or corporation was situated.

The Act was repealed by section 44 of, and Schedule 4 to, the Criminal Justice Administration Act 1914 (c.58).

References
The statutes at large from the 15th to the 20th year of King George III [vol. XVIII]; Charles Bathurst, London. 1765.
Chronological table of the statutes; HMSO, London. 1993. 

Great Britain Acts of Parliament 1741
Repealed Great Britain Acts of Parliament